Efficiency Medal may refer to:
Efficiency Medal, awarded within the United Kingdom and the Commonwealth.
Army Emergency Reserve Efficiency Medal.
Efficiency Medal (New Zealand).
Efficiency Medal (South Africa).
Territorial Force Efficiency Medal. 
Territorial Efficiency Medal.